Alaqsite'w Gitpu School is a K-8 school located in the Listuguj Mi'gmaq First Nation. It opened in 1997. The school offers an English stream from Nursery to Grade 8, a French immersion program from Grades 3 to 8 as well as a Mi'kmaq immersion program from Nursery to Grade 4.

References 

Schools in Quebec
Education in Quebec
Buildings and structures in Gaspésie–Îles-de-la-Madeleine
Mi'kmaq in Canada